Girlfriends is an American situation comedy. The series was on UPN for its first six seasons and was on The CW for its final two seasons, running for a total of 172 episodes. Girlfriends premiered on September 11, 2000, and aired its final episode on February 11, 2008.

Series overview

Episodes

Pilot (1999)

Season 1 (2000–01)

Season 2 (2001–02)

Season 3 (2002–03)

Season 4 (2003–04)

Season 5 (2004–05)

Season 6 (2005–06)

Season 7 (2006–07)

Season 8 (2007–08)

References

External links 
 

Girlfriends